Léonie Yangba Zowe  or Zoe is a filmmaker from the Central African Republic.

Yangba Zowe has studied in France, writing a thesis on the Nigerien filmmaker Oumarou Ganda.

Her super 8 films, made with support from the French Ministry of Cooperation, document Central African Republic dances and rituals. Two of her documentaries were shown at the Créteil International Women's Film Festival in 1989.

Films
 Yangba bolo, 1985
 Lengue, 1985
 N'Zale, 1986
 Paroles de sages, 1987

References

External links
 

Living people
Central African Republic film directors
Women film directors
Year of birth missing (living people)